Mwanza International Airport  is a major regional airport in northern Tanzania serving the city of Mwanza. It serves as the main hub for Auric Air and a secondary hub for Precision Air.

Expansion
A passenger lounge is under construction and will have a capacity of 1 million passengers annually. It was envisaged to be operational by September 2014. Construction stalled after the Tanzanian government failed to make payments to the Chinese contractor, Beijing Construction Engineering Group and in December 2014 construction was due to be completed by October 2015 assuming that funds would be available.

Airlines and destinations

Passenger

Cargo

Air Force Base

The Tanzanian Army's air force command operates an airbase at the south eastern side and has a direct access to runway 30.

Accidents and incidents
On 1 March 2010, The Air Tanzania Flight 100, operated by Boeing 737-200 5H-MVZ sustained substantial damage when it departed the runway on landing and the nosewheel collapsed. Damage was also caused to an engine.

Gallery

See also

 List of airports in Tanzania
 Transport in Tanzania

References

External links

Airports in Tanzania
Buildings and structures in the Mwanza Region